Transancistrus aequinoctialis is a species of catfish in the family Loricariidae. It is native to South America, where it occurs in the Guayas River basin in Ecuador. The species reaches 9 cm (3.5 inches) SL.

References 

Fish described in 1909
Loricariidae